The EuroLeague 3, formerly called the IWBF Challenge Cup, is the fourth level European wheelchair basketball competition of the International Wheelchair Basketball Federation.

Winners

Medals (2009-2019)

See also 
IWBF Champions Cup
André Vergauwen Cup
Willi Brinkmann Cup
Kitakyushu Champions Cup

References 

Wheelchair basketball competitions in Europe
2009 establishments in Europe